Jeremy Borash (born July 19, 1974), is an American professional wrestling play-by-play commentator, announcer, ring announcer, booker, interviewer, and producer,  who was recently signed to WWE. He is known for his work in Impact Wrestling as a multifaceted staff member since the company's inception in 2002 until his departure in 2018. In March 2017, he was appointed as the lead play by play commentator for Impact Wrestling after being mentored by Mike Tenay for many years.

Borash was involved in the now defunct World Championship Wrestling and World Wrestling All-Stars promotions. His most recent title was being a member of the Impact Wrestling broadcast team, as well as a backstage interviewer and member of the Impact creative team. He has also been the host of Impact Wrestling online content such as TNA Today in 2012 and TNA Xplosion in the UK on Challenge TV from 2011-2017.

Radio career
Jeremy Borash was born just outside Minneapolis. Borash started a career in broadcasting at the age of 15, hosting both a nightly radio talk show and live television show in the Twin Cities. Borash's radio show on KSMM in Minneapolis, and television show Jeremy Borash Live! won several Minnesota broadcasting awards, as well as leading to on-air positions at KSTP and KDWB in the Twin Cities.

After graduating from Brown Institute for Broadcasting in Minneapolis, Borash took a position at the age of 19 as a program director/morning show host at KOOL 92 FM in Fort Dodge, Iowa. His popular Borash in the Morning show featured a wide variety of entertainment, including such acts as actually hypnotizing local politicians on the air, skydiving from 13,000 feet over Fort Dodge, and his popular breakfast drive through, where Borash would personally deliver free breakfast to his listeners cars as they drove by. His involvement in local community activities included serving on the board of the United Way, as well as Honorary Chairman for the March of Dimes, which received national attention when Borash became the youngest person ever nominated for radio's prestigious Marconi Award for Broadcasting as America's Small Market Personality of the Year in 1996.

Upon receiving this honor, offers came from around the country, and Borash chose to move back to Minnesota, as morning show host of KXLP in Mankato, Minnesota. At 22, Borash lasted only four months in Mankato, citing major creative differences with management after a New York radio consultant directed the station to name his on-air persona "Flash Borash." Borash soon found redemption months later, as he helped launch the syndicated Ruth Koscielak Show, and as co-host, was back on the very station group he was fired from months earlier through the show's midwest syndication. Borash returned to a radio show format as host of the Impact Wrestling Podcast with TNA Knockout Christy Hemme.

Professional wrestling career

Early career
While working weekdays on the Koscielak show in Minneapolis, Borash started a weekly Saturday morning wrestling show at the very station he started with at the age of 15. Through the show, Borash met internet wrestling executive Bob Ryder, who quickly pitched the show concept to Eric Bischoff of Ted Turner's World Championship Wrestling (WCW).

World Championship Wrestling (1999–2001)
In March 1999, WCW Live! premiered to an online audience with their first guest on the show, Hollywood Hogan. WCW Live! went on to become the most listened to streaming audio program in the world, often reaching fifty thousand live audio streams nightly in an era of this new technology. While doing the nightly two hour internet show for WCW, Borash continued his stint on the Ruth Koscielak Show until August 1999, when he left Minneapolis to work full-time in the offices of WCW in Atlanta, where he went on to become one of the head writers for WCW Monday Nitro on TNT, as well as WCW Thunder on TBS.

Later that year, Borash premiered for the first time on WCW TV, co-hosting the year end special for WCW on TBS. Borash went on to make several appearances on WCW television as a play-by-play announcer for Nitro and Thunder. His role eventually led to an on-air character as Vince Russo's stooge, including a memorable episode where Borash was attacked by Goldberg while driving Russo in his own pope-mobile vehicle at the Cow Palace in San Francisco.

World Wrestling All-Stars (2001–2002)
After the WWF purchased WCW in March 2001, Borash met Australian concert promoter Andrew McManus and together they launched the World Wrestling All-Stars organization. Later that year, Borash left for Australia and worked out of the offices of McManus at Surfers Paradise on the Gold Coast in Queensland, Australia. The promotion's first tour of Australia concluded with a live pay per view from the Sydney Superdome called "The Inception", where Borash provided play-by-play commentary alongside Jerry "The King" Lawler. The WWA would go on to produce numerous international tours, as well as live pay per view events from Las Vegas, Nevada, Glasgow, Scotland, Melbourne, Australia, and Auckland, New Zealand, with Borash serving as executive producer and host.

Total Nonstop Action Wrestling / Impact Wrestling (2002–2018) 

In March 2002, Borash returned to the United States to join Jeff Jarrett in launching TNA Wrestling in Nashville, Tennessee. As the second employee the company hired, Borash worked in several positions for the organization including ring announcer, video editor, and show writer.

In January 2006, Borash became the backstage interviewer for TNA's Impact! on Spike TV, a position he dreamed of as a child, watching his idol Gene Okerlund in the American Wrestling Association (AWA) growing up in Minneapolis. Since becoming backstage interviewer, Borash actually became involved with the kayfabe politics of TNA, as his respect for Kurt Angle led him to be a constant presence during many of Angle's backstage segments and even gained him membership into Angle's stable, the Angle Alliance. He was humorously Karen Angle's maid of honor at her wedding vows renewal to Kurt on the Valentine's Day edition of Impact!.

In April 2007, Borash launched TNA Today on TNAWrestling.com, a show he hosted from the TNA corporate offices.

In early 2008, Borash announced that Samoa Joe was voted the MVP of TNA. Joe then attacked Borash, thus (kayfabe) injuring him, which resulted in Borash wearing a neck brace on television. Borash has gone on to become the host of Internet-based TNA Spin Cycle which aired on TNA's YouTube channel. On January 17, 2010, at Genesis new executive producer Eric Bischoff took Borash off television. After Mick Foley agreed to work with Bischoff, Borash was brought back as the backstage interviewer on February 14 at Against All Odds. At Sacrifice, Borash was made the new ring announcer. On June 14, 2010, Borash began working as the lead play-by-play commentator for TNA Xplosion. He also worked as the color commentator beside Mike Tenay on July 10, 2011, at the Destination X pay-per-view. On October 25, 2012, Borash and the debuting Todd Keneley began working as the announce team for the first hour of Impact Wrestling. from June 12 edition of TNA Xplosion he started commentating with Mike Tenay. In 2012, along with Tenay, he was there for his 10th year with the company. Borash assumed duties as TNA Wrestling's Director of Social Media, and took over the company's marketing online. Borash also was given the role as Executive Producer of the UK's Challenge TV exclusive British Bootcamp, a reality show featuring four aspiring UK wrestlers competing for a TNA contract.

While interviewing Ethan Carter III, Borash was engaged in a feud with him after he interfered to help Rockstar Spud. While Carter and his bodyguard Tyrus tried to head shave the head of Spud but due to interference of Borash, that attempt was failed. Rather than shaving Spud, Carter and Tyrus decided to shave Borash. This event caused an alliance with Spud and Borash, with Borash saving Spud numerous other times from getting his head shaved. Ken Anderson and Mandrews would also start to help Spud as well. On the February 20 episode of Impact Wrestling, Borash, Anderson, Mandrews and Spud made an attempt to shave Carter's head but Tyrus saved him. Tyrus, instead got shaved by Spud.

Deginning in April 2015, Borash began conducting backstage interview at the One Night Only pay-per-view events along with Christy Hemme and some Impact tapings. In addition to this, Borash was still the lead commentator for Xplosion until Josh Mathews took over. Beginning at Bound for Glory 2015, he went on hiatus until returned to interviewing on January 5, 2016. Also in 2016, Borash returned to Xplosion alongside Mathews and took over ring announcer position full-time while Hemme went on hiatus. On March 21, 2016, Borash returned to Impact Wrestling commentary for the night after Lashley attacked color commentator The Pope.

In March 2017, after being mentored by Mike Tenay for many years, Borash was appointed as the lead play-by-play announcer for Impact Wrestling by executive producer Jeff Jarrett. He was involved in a feud with fellow announcer, Josh Mathews, which culminated at Slammiversary with a tag team match featuring Borash and Abyss against Mathews and Scott Steiner. On January 30, 2018, PWInsider reported that Borash had officially left Impact Wrestling, thus ending his long-standing tenure with Impact Wrestling.

WWE (2018-Present)
On January 30, 2018, PWInsider reported Borash had officially signed with WWE, where he works as part of their NXT brand. On May 8, 2020, Jeremy Borash made his first appearance on WWE programming as a part of the 205 Live broadcast team with Tom Phillips.  Borash has been credited by WWE COO Triple H as a true innovator, and was chosen as the director for the Undertaker's "Boneyard Match", which headlined Wrestlemania 36 and was voted 2020 WWE Match of the Year.  Borash's current title in WWE is Senior Director of Content and Development working directly with Shawn Michaels on the NXT brand.

Other media
While working for TNA, Borash took up video editing and producing, and with only a laptop and video camera, set out to make a documentary on ECW, the organization Borash credits for rekindling his childhood love for professional wrestling.

Hardcore Homecoming (2005)
Forever Hardcore led to Borash co-promoting Hardcore Homecoming, a reunion of ECW wrestlers in Philadelphia's famed Alhambra Arena, the place where it all started. The Hardcore Homecoming event held the record for the largest gate of any independent show in United States wrestling history. It was considered a historical success for the era, culminating with a surprise barbwire rematch of one of the most famous matches in ECW history with Terry Funk vs Sabu vs Shane Douglas, with featured referee Mick Foley. The show led to a Hardcore Homecoming tour, and the show's DVDs broke Billboards Top 10 Sports and Rec DVD releases. The release of Forever Hardcore and Hardcore Homecoming in the UK debuted at #1 and #2 on the Sports and Recreational charts, over two years after their US release. The show holds the largest gate in the history of the ECW Arena, as a complete sellout with tickets ranging from $99–$149, with premiums given to all fans attending.

Other television appearances

Filmography

Awards and accomplishments 
 The Baltimore Sun
 Non-Wrestling Performer of the Year (2009)

References

External links
 
 

1974 births
Living people
American radio personalities
American columnists
American television writers
American male television writers
Sportspeople from Minneapolis
Professional wrestling announcers
Professional wrestling executives
Professional wrestling writers
People from Fort Dodge, Iowa
Screenwriters from Minnesota
Screenwriters from Iowa